A paddle steamer is a steamship or steamboat powered by a steam engine that drives paddle wheels to propel the craft through the water. In antiquity, paddle wheelers followed the development of poles, oars and sails, where the first uses were wheelers driven by animals or humans.

In the early 19th century, paddle wheels were the predominant way of propulsion for steam-powered boats. In the late 19th century, paddle propulsion was largely superseded by the screw propeller and other marine propulsion systems that have a higher efficiency, especially in rough or open water. Paddle wheels continue to be used by small, pedal-powered paddle boats and by some ships that operate tourist voyages. The latter are often powered by diesel engines.

Paddle wheels 

The paddle wheel is a large steel framework wheel. The outer edge of the wheel is fitted with numerous, regularly spaced paddle blades (called floats or buckets). The bottom quarter or so of the wheel travels under water. An engine rotates the paddle wheel in the water to produce thrust, forward or backward as required. More advanced paddle-wheel designs feature "feathering" methods that keep each paddle blade closer to vertical while in the water to increase efficiency. The upper part of a paddle wheel is normally enclosed in a paddlebox to minimise splashing.

Types of paddle steamers 

The three types of paddle wheel steamer are stern-wheeler, with a single wheel on the rear, a side-wheeler with one on each side, and an inboard with the paddlewheel mounted in a recess amidship. All were used as riverboats in the United States. Some still operate for tourists, for example on the Mississippi River.

Stern-wheeler

Although the first stern-wheelers were invented in Europe, they saw the most service in North America, especially on the Mississippi River.  was built at Brownsville, Pennsylvania, in 1814 as an improvement over the less efficient side-wheelers. The second stern-wheeler built, Washington of 1816, had two decks and served as the prototype for all subsequent steamboats of the Mississippi, including those made famous in Mark Twain's book Life on the Mississippi.

Side-wheeler

Side-wheelers are used as riverboats and as coastal craft. Though the side wheels and enclosing sponsons make them wider than stern-wheelers, they may be more maneuverable, since they can sometimes move the paddles at different speeds, and even in opposite directions.  This extra maneuverability makes side-wheelers popular on the narrower, winding rivers of the Murray–Darling system in Australia, where a number still operate.

Some were built with paddle clutches that disengage one or both paddles so they can turn independently. However, wisdom gained from early experience with side-wheelers deemed that they be operated with clutches out, or as solid-shaft vessels. Crews noticed that as ships approached the dock, passengers moved to the side of the ship ready to disembark. The shift in weight, added to independent movements of the paddles, could lead to imbalance and potential capsizing. Paddle tugs were frequently operated with clutches in, as the lack of passengers aboard meant that independent paddle movement could be used safely and the added maneuverability exploited to the full.

Inboard paddlewheeler
Recessed or inboard paddlewheel boats were designed to ply narrow and snag infested backwaters. By recessing the wheel within the hull it was protected somewhat from damage. It was enclosed and could be spun at a high speed to provide acute maneuverability. Most were built with inclined steam cylinders mounted on both sides of the paddleshaft and timed 90Deg apart like a locomotive, making them instantly reversing.

Feathering paddle wheel 

In a simple paddle wheel, where the paddles are fixed around the periphery, power is lost due to churning of the water as the paddles enter and leave the water surface. Ideally, the paddles should remain vertical while under water. This ideal can be approximated by use of levers and linkages connected to a fixed eccentric. The eccentric is fixed slightly forward of the main wheel centre. It is coupled to each paddle by a rod and lever. The geometry is designed such that the paddles are kept almost vertical for the short duration that they are in the water.

History

Western world 

The use of a paddle wheel in navigation appears for the first time in the mechanical treatise of the Roman engineer Vitruvius (De architectura, X 9.5–7), where he describes multigeared paddle wheels working as a ship odometer. The first mention of paddle wheels as a means of propulsion comes from the fourth– or fifth-century military treatise De Rebus Bellicis (chapter XVII), where the anonymous Roman author describes an ox-driven paddle-wheel warship:

Italian physician Guido da Vigevano (circa 1280–1349), planning for a new crusade, made illustrations for a paddle boat that was propelled by manually turned compound cranks.

One of the drawings of the Anonymous Author of the Hussite Wars shows a boat with a pair of paddlewheels at each end turned by men operating compound cranks. The concept was improved by the Italian Roberto Valturio in 1463, who devised a boat with five sets, where the parallel cranks are all joined to a single power source by one connecting rod, an idea adopted by his compatriot Francesco di Giorgio.

In 1539, Spanish engineer Blasco de Garay received the support of Charles V to build ships equipped with manually-powered side paddle wheels. From 1539 to 1543, Garay built and launched five ships, the most famous being the modified Portuguese carrack La Trinidad, which surpassed a nearby galley in speed and maneuverability on June 17, 1543, in the harbor of Barcelona. The project, however, was discontinued. 19th century writer Tomás González claimed to have found proof that at least some of these vessels were steam-powered, but this theory was discredited by the Spanish authorities. It has been proposed that González mistook a steam-powered desalinator created by Garay for a steam boiler.

In 1704, French physicist Denis Papin constructed the first ship powered by his steam engine, mechanically linked to paddles. This made him the first to construct a steam-powered boat (or vehicle of any kind). Then, he  poured the first steam cylinder of the world in the iron foundry at Veckerhagen.

In 1787, Patrick Miller of Dalswinton invented a double-hulled boat that was propelled on the Firth of Forth by men working a capstan that drove paddles on each side.

One of the first functioning steamships, Palmipède, which was also the first paddle steamer, was built in France in 1774 by Marquis Claude de Jouffroy and his colleagues. The  steamer with rotating paddles sailed on the Doubs River in June and July 1776. In 1783, a new paddle steamer by de Jouffroy, successfully steamed up the river Saône for 15 minutes before the engine failed. Bureaucracy and the French Revolution thwarted further progress by de Jouffroy.

The next successful attempt at a paddle-driven steam ship was by Scottish engineer William Symington, who suggested steam power to Patrick Miller of Dalswinton. Experimental boats built in 1788 and 1789 worked successfully on Lochmaben Loch. In 1802, Symington built a barge-hauler, for the Forth and Clyde Canal Company. It successfully hauled two 70-ton barges almost  in 6 hours against a strong headwind on test in 1802. Enthusiasm was high, but some directors of the company were concerned about the banks of the canal being damaged by the wash from a powered vessel, and no more were ordered.

While Charlotte Dundas was the first commercial paddle steamer and steamboat, the first commercial success was possibly Robert Fulton's Clermont in New York, which went into commercial service in 1807 between New York City and Albany. Many other paddle-equipped river boats followed all around the world; the first in Europe being  designed by Henry Bell which started a scheduled passenger service on the River Clyde in 1812.

In 1812, the first U.S. Mississippi River paddle steamer began operating out of New Orleans. By 1814, Captain Henry Shreve had developed a "steamboat"  suitable for local conditions. Landings in New Orleans went from 21 in 1814 to 191 in 1819, and over 1,200 in 1833.

The first stern-wheeler was designed by Gerhard Moritz Roentgen from Rotterdam, and used between Antwerp and Ghent in 1827.

Team boats, paddle boats driven by horses, were used for ferries the United States from the 1820s–1850s, as they were economical and did not incur licensing costs imposed by the steam navigation monopoly. In the 1850s, they were replaced by steamboats.

After the American Civil War, as the expanding railroads took many passengers, the traffic became primarily bulk cargoes. The largest, and one of the last, paddle steamers on the Mississippi was the sternwheeler Sprague. Built in 1901, she pushed coal and petroleum until 1948.

In Europe from the 1820s, paddle steamers were used to take tourists from the rapidly expanding industrial cities on river cruises, or to the newly established seaside resorts, where pleasure piers were built to allow passengers to disembark regardless of the state of the tide. Later, these paddle steamers were fitted with luxurious saloons in an effort to compete with the facilities available on the railways. Notable examples are the Thames steamers which took passengers from London to Southend-on-Sea and Margate, Clyde steamers that connected Glasgow with the resort of Rothsay and the Köln-Düsseldorfer cruise steamers on the River Rhine. Paddle steamer services continued into the mid-20th century, when ownership of motor cars finally made them obsolete except for a few heritage examples.

China 

The first mention of a paddle-wheel ship from China is in the History of the Southern Dynasties, compiled in the 7th century but describing the naval ships of the Liu Song dynasty (420–479) used by admiral Wang Zhen'e in his campaign against the Qiang in 418 AD. The ancient Chinese mathematician and astronomer Zu Chongzhi (429–500) had a paddle-wheel ship built on the Xinting River (south of Nanjing) known as the "thousand league boat". When campaigning against Hou Jing in 552, the Liang dynasty (502–557) admiral Xu Shipu employed paddle-wheel boats called "water-wheel boats". At the siege of Liyang in 573, the admiral Huang Faqiu employed foot-treadle powered paddle-wheel boats. A successful paddle-wheel warship design was made in China by Prince Li Gao in 784 AD, during an imperial examination of the provinces by the Tang dynasty (618–907) emperor. The Chinese Song dynasty (960–1279) issued the construction of many paddle-wheel ships for its standing navy, and according to the British biochemist, historian, and sinologist Joseph Needham:

"...between 1132 and 1183 (AD) a great number of treadmill-operated paddle-wheel craft, large and small, were built, including sternwheelers and ships with as many as 11 paddle-wheels a side,".

The standard Chinese term "wheel ship" was used by the Song period, whereas a litany of colorful terms were used to describe it beforehand. In the 12th century, the Song government used paddle-wheel ships en masse to defeat opposing armies of pirates armed with their own paddle-wheel ships. At the Battle of Caishi in 1161, paddle-wheelers were also used with great success against the Jin dynasty (1115–1234) navy. The Chinese used the paddle-wheel ship even during the First Opium War (1839–1842) and for transport around the Pearl River during the early 20th century.

Seagoing paddle steamers 

The first seagoing trip of a paddle steamer was by the Albany in 1808. It steamed from the Hudson River along the coast to the Delaware River. This was purely for the purpose of moving a river-boat to a new market, but paddle-steamers began regular short coastal trips soon after. In 1816 Pierre Andriel, a French businessman, bought in London the  paddle steamer Margery (later renamed Elise) and made an eventful London-Le Havre-Paris crossing, encountering heavy weather on the way. He later operated his ship as a river packet on the Seine, between Paris and Le Havre.

Savannah set out for Liverpool on May 22, 1819, sighting Ireland after 23 days at sea. This was the first powered crossing of the Atlantic, although Savannah was built as a sailing ship with a steam auxiliary; she also carried a full rig of sail for when winds were favorable, being unable to complete the voyage under power alone. In 1822, Charles Napier's , the world's first iron ship, made the first direct steam crossing from London to Paris and the first seagoing voyage by an iron ship.

In 1838, a fairly small steam packet built for the Cork to London route, became the first vessel to cross the Atlantic under sustained steam power, beating Isambard Kingdom Brunel's much larger  by a day. Great Western, however, was actually built for the transatlantic trade, and so had sufficient coal for the passage; Sirius had to burn furniture and other items after running out of coal. Great Westerns more successful crossing began the regular sailing of powered vessels across the Atlantic.  was the first coastal steamship to operate in the Pacific Northwest of North America. Paddle steamers helped open Japan to the Western World in the mid-19th century.

The largest paddle-steamer ever built was Brunel's , but it also had screw propulsion and sail rigging.

In oceangoing service, paddle steamers became much less useful after the invention of the screw propeller, but they remained in use in coastal service and as river tugboats, thanks to their shallow draught and good maneuverability.

The last crossing of the Atlantic by paddle steamer began on September 18, 1969, the first leg of a journey to conclude six months and nine days later. The steam paddle tug  was never intended for oceangoing service, but nevertheless was steamed from Newcastle to San Francisco. As the voyage was intended to be completed under power, the tug was rigged as steam propelled with a sail auxiliary. The transatlantic stage of the voyage was completed exactly 150 years after the voyage of Savannah.

As of 2022, the PS Waverley is the last seagoing passenger-carrying paddle steamer in the world.

Paddle-driven steam warships

Paddle frigates

Beginning in the 1820s, the British Royal Navy began building paddle-driven steam frigates and steam sloops. By 1850 these had become obsolete due to the development of the propeller – which was more efficient and less vulnerable to cannon fire. One of the first screw-driven warships, demonstrated her superiority over paddle steamers during numerous trials, including one in 1845 where she pulled a paddle-driven sister ship backwards in a tug of war. However, paddle warships were used extensively by the Russian Navy during the Crimean War of 1853–1856, and by the United States Navy during the Mexican War of 1846–1848 and the American Civil War of 1861–1865. With the arrival of ironclad battleships from the late 1850s, the last remaining paddle frigates were decommissioned and sold into merchant-navy service by the 1870s. These included , which became one of the first Boston steamers in 1867.

Paddle minesweepers

At the start of the First World War, the Royal Navy requisitioned more than fifty pleasure paddle steamers for use as auxiliary minesweepers. The large spaces on their decks intended for promenading passengers proved to be ideal for handling the minesweeping booms and cables, and the paddles allowed them to operate in coastal shallows and estuaries. These were so successful that a new class of paddle ships, the Racecourse-class minesweepers, were ordered and 32 of them were built before the end of the war.

In the Second World War, some thirty pleasure paddle steamers were again requisitioned; an added advantage was that their wooden hulls did not activate the new magnetic mines. The paddle ships formed six minesweeping flotillas, based at ports around the British coast. Other paddle steamers were converted to anti-aircraft ships. More than twenty paddle steamers were used as emergency troop transports during the Dunkirk Evacuation in 1940, where they were able to get close inshore to embark directly from the beach. Another paddle minesweeper, was deliberately beached twice to allow soldiers to cross to other vessels using her as a jetty. The paddle steamers between them were estimated to have rescued 26,000 Allied troops during the operation, for the loss of six of them.

Modern paddle steamers

China 

In order to thank the Qing government for its support of Japan in the Russo-Japanese War, Japan specially built a yacht called "Yonghe Steamer" for Cixi, which, from the outside, should be a steam-propelled structure, with waterwheel-like waterwheels on both sides to push the ship forward. It can be viewed in the Summer Palace.

US and Canada 

In Oregon, several replica paddle steamers, which are non-steam-powered sternwheelers built in the 1980s and later, are operated for tourism purposes on the Columbia and Willamette Rivers.

, built in 1912 as PS Seeandbee, was the biggest passenger-carrying paddle steamer ever built, with a capacity for 6,000 passengers; it was converted to a training aircraft carrier during World War II. , also built in 1912 with a capacity for 6,000 passengers, operated on the Hudson River from 1913 until it was sunk in an accident in 1926. One of the last paddle steamers built in the U.S. was the dredge , built in 1934 and now a National Historic Landmark.

 is the oldest operating Mississippi River-style steamboat and was named a National Historic Landmark in 1989. Previously named Idlewild and Avalon, Belle of Louisville is based in downtown Louisville, Kentucky.

The Shelburne Museum of Vermont features the paddle steamer , a preserved Lake Champlain ferry, which was transported overland to the museum after being retired from service in 1969, and is now open for tours.

The San Francisco Maritime National Historical Park is host to the Eureka, which is the largest existing wooden ship in the world. She is still afloat as a museum ship.

The ferries system in Toronto, Ontario, Canada operates , a paddle steamer originally built in 1910 and restored for operation since 1976. It is the last sidewheel-propelled vessel on the Great Lakes. Sister ships Bluebell and Mayflower became garbage scows and the former's hull is now a break wall in Toronto Harbour.

Germany 

The Elbe river Saxon Paddle Steamer Fleet in Dresden (known as "White Fleet"), Germany, is the oldest and biggest in the world, with around 700,000 passengers per year. The 1913-built Goethe was the last paddle steamer on the River Rhine.

Paddle wheelers are still in operation on some lakes in Southern Bavaria, such as Diessen on Ammersee, built in 1908 and converted to a diesel system in 1975. It has been completely rebuilt in 2006. As paddle wheelers have proven to be such a great tourist attraction, a new one was even built in 2002 on Ammersee, Herrsching, but it has never been powered by steam. On lake Chiemsee, RMS Ludwig Fessler is still in regular service. It was built in 1926, but is now also powered by diesel engines (since 1973). The original diesel engine was the last ship engine being built by Maffei (no. 576). This engine has ended up in Switzerland to drive the newly renovated Neuchâtel, launched in 2013.

Bangladesh 
The era of paddle steamers in Bangladesh began in 1929 during the British colonial rule. At that time, there were many paddle steamers built by British Government for travel facilities as Bangladesh (Eastern Bengal at that time) is a riverine country. These paddle steamers are also known as Rocket Steamers because at that time these paddle steamers were the fastest water vessel. Now there are 4 paddle steamers on service. They are PS Mahsud (Built: 1929), PS Ostrich (Built: 1929), PS Tern (Built: 1937) and PS Lepcha (Built: 1948–49). PS Mahsud and PS Ostrich are the biggest paddle steamers. These paddle steamers run in the route of Dhaka-Chandpur-Barisal-Morrelganj. These paddle steamers are controlled & superintend by Bangladesh Inland Water Transport Corporation (BIWTC). These paddle steamers are 100 years of heritage of Bangladesh.

Austria 

In Austria only a small paddle steamer fleet operates. There is Gisela from 1872 in Gmunden at the Traunsee, Kaiser Franz Josef I. from 1873 in St. Gilgen at the Lake Wolfgang, Hohentwiel from 1913 in Hard (near Bregenz) at the Lake Constance and Schönbrunn from 1912 in Linz at the Danube.

Italy 

In Italy, a small paddle steamer fleet operates on Lake Como, Lake Maggiore and Lake Garda, primarily for tourist purposes. The paddle steamer Piemonte (1904) operates on Lake Maggiore, and sister paddle steamers Patria (1926) and Concordia (1926) operate on Lake Como. Former paddle steamers Italia (1909) and Giuseppe Zanardelli (1903) operate on Lake Garda; their steam engines, unlike in the ships that sail on lakes Como and Maggiore, were replaced with diesel engines in the 1970s, thus making them paddle motorships.

In addition to these five operational paddle steamers, the former paddle steamer Milano (1904) operates on Lake Como as a screw motorship, still retaining its (empty) paddle wheels; the decommissioned paddle steamer Lombardia (1908) is used as a floating restaurant in Arona, on Lake Maggiore; while the decommissioned paddle steamer Plinio (1903) lies at the bottom of the Lago di Mezzola, where it sank due to neglect in 2010.

Denmark 
 has been operation with the same company since she was built in 1861. Sailing passengers to and from Silkeborg and Himmelbjerget ever since, using her original steam engine she was built with.

Norway 
 is the oldest steamship in regular operation. Built in 1856, she still operates on lake Mjøsa in Norway.

Switzerland 

Switzerland has a large paddle steamer fleet, most of the "Salon Steamer-type" built by Sulzer in Winterthur or Escher-Wyss in Zurich. There are five active and one inactive on Lake Lucerne, two on Lake Zurich, and one each on Lake Brienz, Lake Thun and Lake Constance. Swiss company CGN operates a number of paddle steamers on Lake Geneva. Their fleet includes three converted to diesel electric power in the 1960s and five retaining steam. One, Montreux, was reconverted in 2000 from diesel to an all-new steam engine. It is the world's first electronically remote-controlled steam engine and has operating costs similar to state-of-the-art diesels, while producing up to 90 percent less air pollution.

Active vessels 
Lakes of Biel, Morat and Neuchâtel (connected by channels):
 Neuchâtel (built in 1912)
Lake Brienz:
 Lötschberg (1914)
Lake Geneva:
 Montreux (1904), Italie (1908),La Suisse II (1910), Savoie (1914), Simplon (1919), Rhône III (1927)
Lake Lucerne:
 Stadt Luzern (1928, last steam ship built for Switzerland), Uri (1901, oldest Swiss paddle wheel steamer), Schiller (1906), Gallia (1913), Unterwalden (1902)

Lake Thun:
  (1906)
Lake Zurich:
 Stadt Zürich (1909), Stadt Rapperswil (1914)

Note: The oldest active Swiss steamship is Greif (1895, on the Greifensee) with screw propulsion.

France 

No paddle ship is currently in operation in France as of 2015 (though some Paris sightseeing tourist crafts sport a dummy sternwheel powered by a hydraulic motor).

She was built, like most of its Swiss counterparts by Escher-Wyss in 1909 (as a CKD dismantled kit to be transported by railway and assembled at the local annecy Puya Shipyard) and ran a regular line around Lac d'Annecy. During World War II the ship was laid up in Annecy and used as a prison by the German occupying forces and the Gestapo. La France made her last commercial voyage in 1965 and then fell into neglect and disrepair. Her owner had moored her some distance from the shore to save quay fees and she sprung an ice related leak and sunk in March 1971. It is a popular site among advanced divers (Level 2-assisted or 3-autonomous CMAS is requested to dive the wreck), an almost intact time capsule due to the fresh and low temperature water. Some divers even (mimic to) play underwater French billiard on the intact billiard table in the main lounge. Any hope of raising the ship is vain though: the hull was badly distorted when hitting the rocky lake bottom.

The former British paddle steamer, a veteran of the Dunkirk Evacuations, is preserved as a restaurant in Dunkirk harbour.

United Kingdom 
, a Clyde steamer built in 1947, is the last seagoing paddle steamer in the world. This ship sails a full season of cruises from ports around Britain, and sailed across the English Channel to commemorate the sinking of her predecessor of 1899 at the 1940 Battle of Dunkirk.

Based at Wareham,  (one of the smallest passenger-carrying vessels of her type, with a passenger capacity of only 12) takes trips on the River Frome. Monarch is a side wheeler privately built at Chatham Historic Dockyard.

In the River Dart (Devon)  (a coal-fired river paddle steamer) operates short cruises from Dartmouth and trips between Dartmouth and Totnes at high tide.

 was the last paddle steamer built in the United Kingdom and was completed in 1953 for service on Loch Lomond. She went out of service in 1981 but is now open as a static museum ship and restoration is ongoing subject to funding. Also under restoration is the 1924 , a veteran of the Dunkirk evacuation, which is berthed at Gillingham, Kent.

USSR 
In the USSR, river paddle steamers of the type Iosif Stalin (project 373), later renamed s, were built until 1951. Between 1952 and 1959, ships of this type were built for the Soviet Union by Óbudai Hajógyár Budapest factory in Hungary. In total, 75 type Iosif Stalin/Ryazan sidewheelers were built. Few of them still remain in active service.

Australia 

Australia has a large collection of authentic and replica paddle steamers and paddle boats operating along the Murray and Darling Rivers, and in other areas around the country. Echuca/Moama has the largest fleet of paddle steamers in Australia, with seven operating commercially, and a large number of smaller privately owned vessels.

 is the oldest wooden-hulled paddle steamer in the world. Built in 1866, she operates from the Port of Echuca.

, built in Moama in 1911 and based in Echuca, is still working as a tourist attraction on the Murray River. Pevensey also starred as the fictional paddlesteamer Philadelphia in the TV series All the Rivers Run.

PS Etona is now privately owned, but was built as a church mission boat for the SA Murray: sponsored by the Anglican Archbishop of Adelaide, and funded by old boys of Eton (UK).  It had a small chapel.  Larger gathering were held on riverbanks and in woolsheds.  After retirement, it became a fishing boat, then moved to Echuca to be a private houseboat.  It also appeared in 'All the rivers' run, reprising its role as a mission boat.

PS Alexander Arbuthnot, built 1923 at Koondrook, and named after the former owner of the Arbuthnot Sawmills, works today as a tourist boat at the Port of Echuca.

, built 1913 at Goolwa, is currently operating public cruises in Echuca. Canberra was built for the Conner family of Boundary Bend, as their flagship fishing vessel, but has been in the tourism industry since 1944.

, a replica steamer, was built in 1982 at Barham, and operates a large range of cruises in Echuca – from one-hour sightseeing trips to three-night and four-day fully accommodated voyages. She is powered by an authentic steam engine, dating back to 1906.

PS Melbourne, built 1912, operates sightseeing cruises from Mildura.

, the largest of the paddle wheelers operating in Australia [diesel, not steam], is a recent build (1987). It has accommodation for 120 passengers and up to 30 crew, and operates three, four and seven-night cruises along the Murray, from Mannum in South Australia. Murray Princess was owned and operated for many years by Captain Cook Cruises in Sydney, but was sold to the SeaLink Travel Group, now the Kelsian Group, based in Adelaide.
It was once in a fleet of three vessels.  

PS Murray River Queen was built in 1974 and retired from active service in 1993. She was moved from Waikerie in 2017 and is now permanently moored in Renmark.

The replica paddle steamer  was constructed in Gippsland, Australia, and launched in November 2008.  As at 2020, it was on the hard at Paynesville, with an uncertain future.

PV Kookaburra Queen [diesel, not steam] operates on the Brisbane River as a floating restaurant or venue for hire, along with SWPV Kookaburra Queen II

, which was built in Echuca in 1876–78, was used on the Murray River, the Darling River and the Murrumbidgee River in New South Wales. She was acquired by the National Museum of Australia in 1984, restored to full working order, and is now berthed as an exhibit outside the museum at a wharf on the Acton Peninsula, Lake Burley Griffin, Canberra.

PV Pyap runs tourist cruises from the Swan Hill Pioneer Settlement in Swan Hill, Victoria.

PS Industry is based at Renmark.

PS Marion is based at Mannum.  It is run by volunteers, and runs short local cruises, and extended overnight ones.  PV Mayflower is run by the same people.

PS Ruby is based at Wentworth (NSW).

 is based at Goolwa.

PS Canally is under restoration at Morgan.

PS Cumberoona was built as a bicentennial project by Albury City Council.  It suffered from uncertain water levels, and has been transferred to Lake Mulwala (Yarrawonga Weir, on Murray River).

The paddle wheeler Nepean Belle operates cruises on the Nepean River at Penrith, New South Wales.

PV Thomson Belle operates cruises on Thomson River (Longreach, Qld).  It was originally PS Ginger Belle on Maroochy River, and retains its steam equipment as a display item.

PS Decoy operates on Swan River (Perth, WA).

Replica PV Golden City is on Lake Wendouree (Ballarat, Vic.).  The original was on that lake, then went to Caribbean Gardens (a Melbourne recreational park), then back to Ballarat for restoration.  That was nearly complete when the shed and the vessel were destroyed by arson.  The group then built a replica.

PV Begonia Princess on Lake Wendouree (Ballarat, Vic.).

Replica PS William IV on Hunter River (Newcastle, NSW).  This was built as a bicentennial project (1988), languished on the hard for many years while fundraising took place, but is active again.

PV Julie Fay ran local morning/afternoon-cruises on Murray River for many years, then was sold for private use.  It is now a static b&b, moored somewhere near Cobram or Tocumwal.

New Zealand 
The restored paddle steamer  is based in Wanganui. Waimarie was built in kitset form in Poplar, London in 1899, and originally operated on the Whanganui River under the name Aotea.  Later renamed, she remained in service until 1949.  She sank at her moorings in 1952, and remained in the mud until raised by volunteers and restored to begin operations again in 2000.

The 1907 Otunui Paddleboat operated on the Whanganui River until the 1940s in her original form as a tunnel screw riverboat. Lost from her mooring in a flood she was refloated in the late 1960s and rebuilt as a sternwheeled jetboat. Around 1982 she went overland to Lake Okataina and was converted to the sidepaddle vessel as she is today. Currently operating on the Wairoa River at Tauranga, this , diesel powered vessel with hydraulic drive for the paddlewheels offers scenic cruises and charters.

The Netherlands 

Kapitein Kok is a paddle steamer built in 1911 for ferry service on the river Lek. It was fully restored in 1976 and is still in use today as a party ship. Queen Beatrix chartered the ship in 1998 as part of her 60th birthday celebrations. The paddle steamer De Majesteit was built in 1926. In 1958, a part of the movie G.I. Blues featuring Elvis Presley was shot on board of this ship.

Japan 

Michigan is a paddle wheeler built in 1982, for cruising on the Lake Biwa at Shiga. The name is from Michigan, a sister region of Shiga.

Paddle tugs 

 is a preserved steam-powered sternwheel tug based in Portland, Oregon, that is listed on the U.S. National Register of Historic Places.

The British Admiralty's Royal Maritime Auxiliary Service constructed a new  "Director" class of diesel-electric paddle tugs as recently as 1957 and 1958. Each paddle wheel was driven by an individual electric motor, giving outstanding maneuverability. Paddle tugs were able to more easily make use of the inherent advantage of side wheel paddle propulsion, having the option to disconnect the clutches that connected the paddle drive shafts as one. This enabled them to turn one paddle ahead and one astern to turn and maneuver quickly.

See also

Notes

References

Bibliography
 Clark, John and Wardle, David (2003). PS Enterprise. Canberra: National Museum of Australia.
 University of Wisconsin–La Crosse Historic Steamboat Photographs 
 Dumpleton, Bernard, "The Story of the Paddle Steamer", Melksham, 2002.

External links 

 links to videos on paddle wheelers
 links to photos of a modern design on paddle wheelers
 Australian paddle steamers  A brief history
 Paddle Steamer Preservation Society (PSPS)

 
Marine steam propulsion
Ship types